Rudel is a surname. Notable people with the surname include:

Hans-Ulrich Rudel (1916–1982), highly decorated German pilot during World War II and post-war neo-Nazi activist
Jaufre Rudel (died in or after 1147), Prince of Blaye and a troubadour
Julius Rudel (1921–2014), Austrian-born American opera and orchestra conductor
Wulgrin II of Angoulême (c. 1089–1140), called Rudel, possibly the father or father-in-law of Jaufre Rudel

Fictional characters:
Hanna Rudel, a fictional character from the anime/manga series Strike Witches

Computing:
Rudel is a plugin for the GNU Emacs text editor allowing collaborative real-time editing using the Obby protocol.

See also
Günther Rüdel (1883–1950), German general in the Luftwaffe during World War II
Rudel Scandal, a 1976 political scandal involving Hans-Ulrich Rudel
Rudel "Rudy" Miller (1900–1994), American college athlete and professional baseball player
Rudl, a Norwegian folk dance

German-language surnames